Adlabad may refer to:

Adlabad, Lorestan

See also
Adelabad (disambiguation)